Rockefeller Park is a city park named in honor of oil magnate John D. Rockefeller Sr., located in Cleveland, Ohio. Besides the distinction of being the largest park located completely within city limits, Rockefeller Park is a link in a chain of parkland that connects the heights region of the eastern suburbs to the city's lakefront. Following the path of Martin Luther King Jr. Drive and spanning a large section of Cleveland's East Sides, the park runs in a northwesterly path between suburban Shaker Heights, bisecting the University Circle neighborhood and terminating at Gordon Park on the city's lakefront, opened to the public in 1897.
The park was dramatically expanded during the 1930s with labor provided by the Works Progress Administration. Landmarks found in Rockefeller Park include two separate entries on the National Register of Historic Places: one for its architecturally historic bridges, and one for its Cultural Gardens.

Points of interest
 Cultural Gardens - one of park's two registrants found on the National Register of Historic Places, the Cultural Gardens serve to commemorate many of the ethnic groups who have enriched the city of Cleveland, as well as that of the United States.
 Doan Brook -  A seven-mile long stream that runs from suburban Shaker Lakes to Lake Erie,  the brook was an essential feature in the establishment of the routing of the park.
 Rockefeller Park Greenhouse - located at the northeastern edge of the park between Martin Luther King Jr. Drive and E.88th St, the greenhouse and its gardens occupy four acres and opened in 1905.

References

External links

Parks in Cleveland
Urban public parks
National Register of Historic Places in Cleveland, Ohio
Historic districts in Cleveland
Road bridges on the National Register of Historic Places in Ohio
Parks on the National Register of Historic Places in Ohio
Protected areas established in 1897